Komono is a district in the Lékoumou Region of the Republic of the Congo. The capital lies at Komono.

Towns and villages

Lékoumou Department
Districts of the Republic of the Congo